Dahira taiwana is a moth of the family Sphingidae. It is known from Taiwan.

References

Dahira
Moths described in 1998